Ludwig Schuster (born March 30, 1951) is a German former football midfielder who played for 1. FC Nürnberg, FC Bayern Hof, FC Bayern Munich, 1. FC Saarbrücken and Fortuna Köln.

External links

1951 births
Living people
German footballers
Association football midfielders
1. FC Nürnberg players
FC Bayern Munich footballers
1. FC Saarbrücken players
SC Fortuna Köln players
FC Biel-Bienne players
Bundesliga players
2. Bundesliga players